John A. Mulheren Jr. (June 20, 1949 in The Bronx, New York — December 15, 2003 in Rumson, New Jersey) was an American businessman, investor, and philanthropist.

Biography
Born in the Bronx, Mulheren was a Wall Street icon who earned millions in the 1980s as a stock and option trader. Mulheren became a managing director for Merrill Lynch at age 25 and later became the chief executive of Bear Wagner Specialists, one of seven NYSE specialist trading firms. He owned the Chapel Beach Club located in Sea Bright, New Jersey and Crazees Ice Cream in Rumson, New Jersey.

A protégé of Ivan Boesky, Mulheren was implicated in the insider trading scandals of the late 1980s  and was convicted on fraud and conspiracy charges in 1990. Mulheren's involvement in the scandals and his relationship with Boesky are discussed with great detail in Den of Thieves by James B. Stewart. Upon learning that Boesky had implicated him in the scandal, Mulheren reportedly set out to kill Boesky. Mulheren's conviction was overturned by the Second Circuit Court of Appeals in 1991.

Mulheren graduated from Roanoke College in 1971.  He donated millions to the college naming several buildings after former professors and mentors.  The entrance to the college is named "John's Bridge" in his honor.  Mulheren's widow, Nancy, is a college trustee.

Mulheren suffered from bipolar disorder. He died of cardiac arrest that followed a seizure he suffered at his Bingham Drive home on December 15, 2003.  Bruce Springsteen, a close friend, performed at the funeral.

References

1949 births
2003 deaths
People from Rumson, New Jersey
People from the Bronx
Roanoke College alumni
American chief executives of financial services companies
American derivatives traders
American financiers
American restaurateurs
American investors
Philanthropists from New York (state)
American stock traders
Businesspeople from New Jersey
Businesspeople from New York City
Merrill (company) people
Bear Stearns
People with bipolar disorder
American people convicted of fraud
20th-century American philanthropists
20th-century American businesspeople
American people of Irish descent